Les Bons Villers is a municipality of Wallonia located in the province of Hainaut, Belgium. 

On 1 January 2018 the municipality had 9,457 inhabitants. The total area is 42.55 km², giving a population density of 222 inhabitants per km².

The municipality consists of the following districts: Frasnes-lez-Gosselies, Mellet, Rèves, Villers-Perwin and Wayaux.

References

External links
 

Municipalities of Hainaut (province)